Francis Clyde Duffy (March 20, 1890 – December 19, 1977) was a North Dakota Republican Party politician who served as the 25th Lieutenant Governor of North Dakota under Governor John E. Davis. Duffy also served in the North Dakota Senate from 1949 to 1956.

Notes

Lieutenant Governors of North Dakota
1890 births
1977 deaths
Republican Party North Dakota state senators
20th-century American politicians